Paeniclostridium sordellii is a rare anaerobic, gram-positive, spore-forming rod with peritrichous flagella that is capable of causing pneumonia, endocarditis, arthritis, peritonitis, and myonecrosis. C. sordellii bacteremia and sepsis occur rarely. Most cases of sepsis from C. sordellii occur in patients with underlying conditions. Severe toxic shock syndrome among previously healthy persons has been described in a small number of C. sordellii cases, most often associated with gynecologic infections in women and infection of the umbilical stump in newborns. It has also been described in post-partum females, medically induced abortions, injection drug users and trauma cases. So far, all documented post-partum females who contracted C. sordellii septicaemia have died, and all but one woman who contracted the bacterium post-abortion have died .


Infection 
The source of the bacteria has not been determined but it has been documented that about 0.5% to 10% of healthy women are lengthened vaginal carriage of C. sordellii. There are several clinical features which are unique to C. sordellii: marked leukocytosis (leukaemoid reaction), refractory hypotension, severe tachycardia, haemoconcentration, persistent apyrexia and profound capillary leak syndrome (see entry for Clostridium novyi alpha-toxin for details of mechanism).  In terms of management, there is no hard and fast rule, as with most bacterial pathogens, but past data reveals C. sordellii susceptibility to beta-lactams, clindamycin, tetracycline and chloramphenicol but resistant to aminoglycosides and sulphonamides.

References

External links 
 McGregor.pdf
 Pathema-Clostridium Resource
 Type strain of Clostridium sordellii at BacDive -  the Bacterial Diversity Metadatabase

Clostridiaceae
Gram-positive bacteria
Healthcare-associated infections
Gas gangrene
Bacteria described in 1927